Turbines is the fifth studio album from English band Tunng. It was released in June 2013 under Full Time Hobby.

Track listing

References

External links
Turbines by Tunng on iTunes.com

2013 albums
Full Time Hobby albums
Tunng albums